Gough Lake is a lake in Alberta, Canada.

Gough Lake has the name of a government surveyor.

References

Lakes of Alberta